Jun'ichi or Junichi is a masculine Japanese given name.

Possible writings
Junichi can be written using different kanji characters. "Ichi" is nearly always written with the character  ("one") or its daiji (large numerals) form , while "jun" might be written with a variety of characters, including:
, "pure"
, "honest"
, "moisture"
, "standard"
, "obey"
, "approve"
The name can also be written in hiragana or katakana.

People with the name
, Japanese sumo wrestler
, Japanese sumo wrestler
, Japanese conductor
, Japanese diplomat
, Japanese singer
, Japanese footballer
, Japanese speed skater
, Japanese politician
, Japanese actor and producer
, Japanese artist, sculptor, and installation artist
, Japanese voice actor
, Japanese Go player
, Japanese rower
, Japanese streamer
, Japanese Paralympic swimmer
, Japanese Nordic combined skier
, Japanese three-cushion billiards player
, Japanese animator
, Japanese video game composer
, Japanese footballer
, Japanese swimmer
, Japanese graphic artist and fashion designer
, Japanese video game composer
, Japanese engineer
, Japanese singer and actor
Juniti Saito (born 1942), Brazilian Air Force general
, Japanese naval aviator
, Japanese anime director
, Japanese kickboxer
Junichi P. Semitsu (born 1973), American professor of law
, Japanese voice actor
, Japanese voice actor
, Japanese baseball player
, Japanese computer scientist
, Japanese long jumper
, Japanese writer
, Japanese astronomer
, Japanese footballer
Junichi Yamakawa, author of Kuso Miso Technique
, Japanese voice actor
, Japanese poet

Fictional characters
Junichi Kawanaka (純一), a pitcher in the manga One Outs
Jun'ichi Tsubaki (純一), a character in the manga Rockin' Heaven
Jun'ichi Nagase, a main character in the anime Akaneiro ni Somaru Saka
Jun'ichi Aikawa, a hero character in the anime Choujuu Sentai Liveman

See also
6052 Junichi, a main-belt asteroid

Japanese masculine given names